Carlão may refer to:

People
A nickname for people with given name Carlos, such as:
Carlão (footballer, born January 1986), full name Carlos Roberto da Cruz Júnior, Brazilian footballer
Carlão (footballer, born August 1986), full name Carlos Alexandre Souza Silva, Brazilian footballer
Carlão (footballer, born 1990), full name Carlos Augusto Borret dos Santos, Brazilian footballer
Carlão (footballer, born 1992), full name Carlos Henrique de Moura Brito, Brazilian footballer
Carlão (footballer, born 2001), full name Carlos Eduardo da Silva Santos, Brazilian footballer
Carlos Barreto (born 1968), Brazilian MMA fighter
Antônio Gouveia (born 1965), Brazilian volleyball player
Carlos "Carlão" Santos (born 1976), Brazilian jiu-jitsu heavyweight champion

Places
, a civil parish of Alijó Municipality, Portugal

See also
Carlos (disambiguation)